Bran End is a village in Essex, England.

External links

Villages in Essex
Uttlesford